The Mostazal River is a river in the Coquimbo Region in Chile. It flows from east to west and changes its name to Rapel River (Coquimbo)  which flows into the Embalse La Paloma.

See also
List of rivers of Chile

References
 EVALUACION DE LOS RECURSOS HIDRICOS SUPERFICIALES EN LA CUENCA DEL RIO BIO BIO

Rivers of Chile
Rivers of Coquimbo Region